PDRA may refer to:
Pan-drug resistant Acinetobacter, a type of bacterium
Parental Divorce Reduction Act
Participatory disaster risk assessment
Postdoctoral research assistant
Postdoctoral Research Award, funded by the Qatar National Research Fund
Preventable drug-related hospital admission
Professional Drag Racers Association
People's Democratic Republic of Algeria